Memphis Two-Step is a 1971 album by jazz flutist Herbie Mann. It was released on Mann's Embryo Records label, and distributed by Cotillion Records, a division of Atlantic Records.

Track listing
Side A (tracks 1-4)/Side One (sic) (tracks 5-7)
"Soul Man" (Isaac Hayes, David Porter) (4:49)
"The Night They Drove Old Dixie Down" (J. R. Robertson )(5:25)
"Memphis Two-Step" (Don Sebesky) 	(6:27)
"Down on the Corner" (John Fogerty) (5:50)
"Guinnevere" (David Crosby) 	(8:00)
"Acapulco Rain" (Mann) 	(7:54)
"Kabuki Rock" (William S. Fischer) (5:30)

Personnel
Herbie Mann - flute, producer
Tracks 1, 2:
Melvin Lastie and Ike Williams - flugelhorns and trumpets (#1,2)
George Bohanon - trombone and baritone horn
Albert Vescovo - guitar
John Barnes - drums
Darrell Clayborn - bass
Richard Waters - drums
Track 3:
Roy Ayers - vibes
Larry Coryell and Reggie Young - guitars
Bobby Emmons - organ
Bobby Wood - electric piano
Mike Leech - Fender bass
Gene Chrisman - drums
Remaining tracks:
Eric Weissberg, Sonny Sharrock and Charlie Brown - guitars
Miroslav Vitouš - bass
Bruno Carr - drums
Carlos "Patato" Valdes - conga (track 4)
Richard Resnicoff - guitar (replacing Charlie Brown on tracks 6, 7)
Ron Carter - bass (tracks 6, 7)
Eddie Simon - rainmaker (track 6)
Technical
Tom Dowd, David Green - recording engineer
Katsuji Abe - photography 
Haig Adishian - album design

Production
Tracks 1, 2 recorded at United Recording Studios, Los Angeles, California
Track 3 recorded at American Sound Studios, Memphis, Tennessee, engineered by Tom Dowd
All other selections recorded at A&R Studios, New York City

Charting

The album peaked at #3 on the Billboard Jazz Album chart, #41 on the Billboard R&B Album chart, and #137 on the Billboard 200. "Memphis Two-Step" and "Soul Man" were released as a single.

See also
Herbie Mann discography

References
Memphis Two-Step, Herbie Mann. Embryo Records SD 531 (1971) (liner notes)

External links
Memphis Two-Step' at Allmusic.com

Herbie Mann albums
Crossover jazz albums
1971 albums
Embryo Records albums